Peracreadium is a genus of trematodes in the family Opecoelidae. It is very similar to the related genus Cainocreadium Nicoll, 1909, and has been synonymised with the genera Anabathycreadium Salman & Srivastava, 1990, Indocreadium Salman & Srivastava, 1990, and Lebouria Nicoll, 1909.

Species
Peracreadium akenovae Cribb, Bray & Cutmore, 2013
Peracreadium characis (Stossich, 1886) Bartoli, Gibson & Bray, 1989
Peracreadium commune (Olsson, 1868) Nicoll, 1909
Peracreadium genu (Rudolphi, 1819) Nicoll, 1909
Peracreadium gibsoni Kornijchuk & Gaevskaya, 2001
Peracreadium idoneum (Nicoll, 1909) Gibson & Bray, 1982
Peracreadium kareii (Shen & Qiu, 1995) Cribb, 2005
Peracreadium longicirrus (Salman & Srivastava, 1990) Cribb, 2005
Peracreadium megaformis (Salman & Srivastava, 1990) Cribb, 2005
Peracreadium mycteropercae (Sogandares-Bernal, 1959) Pritchard, 1966

References

Opecoelidae
Plagiorchiida genera